Brian Wright (born 1983) is the general manager of the San Antonio Spurs since August 2019.

Wright is the co-author of two books, titled '100 Heroes: People in Sports Who Make This a Better World' and '150 Heroes'.

He and his wife, Cara, have two children.

Early life and career 
Wright, the youngest of three brothers and sisters, was raised in Silver Spring, Maryland.

Wright, a 5-foot-9 guard, played Division III basketball at La Sierra University in Riverside, California where he was honored to the Riverside Sports Hall of Fame for his exceptional performances in the 2003 and 2004 seasons.

Wright attended graduate school at UCF College of Business to earn a master's degree in sport business management (MSBM) from the DeVos Sport Business Management program in 2007.

Wright worked for the National Consortium for Academics and Sports (2006–07) under Richard Lapchick, the Orlando Magic (2006–14) for eight years moving up the ranks from summer intern to player development and college scouting manager, and the Detroit Pistons (2014–16) for two years as assistant general manager.

San Antonio Spurs 
In August 2016, Wright became the assistant general manager of San Antonio Spurs, stepping into the position vacated by both Sean Marks and Scott Layden. In the summer of 2019, Wright was the key player in the re-signing of Rudy Gay, and arranging the trade that steered DeMarre Carroll to San Antonio.

R.C. Buford (GM since 2002) was promoted to the CEO title in 2019. In July 2019, San Antonio Spurs announced the promotion of Wright to the general manager position.

Wright and the Spurs organization selected Devin Vassell with the 11th pick, the highest draft pick since Tim Duncan, in the 2020 NBA Draft. Wright and the team drafted Tre Jones with the 41st pick in the 2020 NBA Draft. Following the 2020 draft picks, Wright commented “The league has really changed, where you really looked at guys as one-position players, and you’re either a one, a two, a three, a four, or a five. What you see now is you’ve got guards, you’ve got wings and you’ve got bigs...You want guys that are versatile and can play multiple positions, and I think with Devin for sure he can play across multiple positions, and as he gets stronger, he’ll be able to do that even more...He’ll be able to play one through four in a few years”

On March 29, 2021, Wright and the team signed Gorgui Dieng and waived Marquese Chriss.

See also 
 List of National Basketball Association general managers

References 

Living people
1983 births
San Antonio Spurs executives
National Basketball Association general managers
La Sierra University alumni
People from Silver Spring, Maryland